The Port of A Coruña is a port in A Coruña, Spain, on the Atlantic Ocean. The port complex occupies 1.15 km² of land and 9.94 km² of water along 7 km of waterfront.

Docks
The Port of A Coruña has  for the different services:
 in the commercial docks
 in the fishing basins
 in the Marina and Antedársena basins.

References

External links
 Official website 
 Puertos del Estado 

Coruna
Buildings and structures in A Coruña
Transport in A Coruña